Jesus Over Everything is the first live praise and worship album from Planetboom. Venture3Media released the album on 22 March 2019.

Critical reception

Joshua Andre, specifying in a four and a half star review for 365 Days of Inspiring Media, replies, "this release is probably the best dance/remix-y/electronic debut I’ve heard since Hillsong Young & Free’s We Are Young & Free in 2013. 

Signaling in a four and a half star review for Louder Than the Music, Jono Davies states, "this album is a real mish mash of sounds and can lose the flow of the album at times, especially with the live tracks are thrown in - but the fact there are so many styles actually keeps the album fresh and exciting". 

Stephen Luff, indicating in an eight out of ten review from Cross Rhythms, says "Without doubt, this album addresses the musical status quo of most similar albums and as such should be applauded".

Track listing

References

2019 live albums
Planetboom albums
Christian music albums by Australian artists